Netherbury is a village and civil parish in the English county of Dorset. The A3066 road connecting those towns lies 0.5 miles to the east.

Population
In the 2011 census the parish, including the villages of Melplash and Salway Ash, and the small settlements of Atrim, Oxbridge, Waytown, North and South Bowood, Wooth, Silkhay, Mangerton, Whitecross, Filford, Dottery, Hincknowle and Loscombe, had a population of 1,314. Netherbury is within an electoral ward that bears its name and stretches south to the edge of Bridport. The ward population was 2,080.

Facilities
Along with domestic buildings, Netherbury village has a church, a village hall, and a play park. The church has a Norman font, a 15th-century altar tomb and a 16th-century pulpit. The hills surrounding the village show examples of strip lynchets.

The River Brit used to serve several mills to process the flax used in Bridport's rope-making industry. In Netherbury, the river is crossed by a 17th-century bridge with three dissimilar arches: a larger, round eastern arch accommodated the millrace.

The novelist Mary Anna Needell lived in Netherbury with her family in the 1880s. Kingsland House was the birthplace of Vice-Admiral Sir Samuel Hood, 1st Baronet (1762–1814).

See also
River Cottage

Notes

External links

Netherbury village website
Parish council website
The Seafaring Hoods of Netherbury

Villages in Dorset
Civil parishes in Dorset